Melissa Miller may refer to:

 Melissa Miller (artist) (born 1951), American painter
 Melissa Miller (politician), member of the New York State Assembly
 Melissa Miller, musician in Good 2 Go
 Melissa Miller in Miller v Miller
 Melissa Miller, producer on The Tested
 Melissa F. Miller, author of thriller novels, including the Sasha McCandless, Shenandoah Shadows, Aroostine Higgins, and Bodhi King series
 Emme (model), plus-size fashion model born Melissa Miller (1963)

See also
Melissa Scott-Miller (born 1959), English artist
Melissa Scott-Hayward (born 1990), cricketer